Temidayo Jordan Odeyingbo (born September 24, 1999) is an American football defensive end for the Indianapolis Colts of the National Football League (NFL). He played college football at Vanderbilt, and was drafted by the Colts in the second round of the 2021 NFL Draft.

Early life and high school
The son of Nigerian immigrants, Odeyingbo was born in Brooklyn, New York, and grew up in Irving, Texas, where he attended Ranchview High School. He had 108 tackles and 12 sacks over the course of his high school career. Odeyingbo committed to play college football at Vanderbilt over offers from Texas, Oklahoma, Texas A&M, Colorado, Baylor, and Purdue.

College career
Odeyingbo was a member of the Vanderbilt Commodores for four seasons. As a senior, he was named second-team All-SEC after recording 32 tackles, 8.0 tackles for loss, and 5.5 sacks in eight games. Odeyingbo finished his collegiate career with 125 tackles, 31.0 tackles for loss, and 12.0 sacks. Odeyingbo tore his achilles tendon while preparing for the 2021 NFL Draft.

Professional career

Despite his injury, Odeyingbo was selected by the Indianapolis Colts in the second round with the 54th overall pick in the 2021 NFL Draft. On May 6, 2021, Odeyingbo officially signed with the Colts. He was placed on the reserve/non-football injury list to start the 2021 season. He was activated on October 30.

Personal life
Odeyingbo's older brother, Dare, also played football at Vanderbilt and for the Cincinnati Bengals and Tampa Bay Buccaneers.

References

External links
Vanderbilt Commodores bio

1999 births
Living people
People from Irving, Texas
Sportspeople from the Dallas–Fort Worth metroplex
American sportspeople of Nigerian descent
Players of American football from Texas
American football defensive ends
Vanderbilt Commodores football players
Indianapolis Colts players